Brestrich is a German surname. Notable people with the surname include:

Heiko Brestrich (born 1965), German footballer and manager
Ingrid Brestrich (born 1957), German athlete

German-language surnames